Crashing may refer to:

 Gate crashing, the act of entering an event without an invitation
 Wedding crashing, the act of entering a wedding without an invitation

Television
 Crashing (British TV series), a 2016 British comedy drama series
 Crashing (American TV series), 2017 American comedy series

Music
"Crashing", song by The Residents from Not Available
"Crashing", song by Illenium from Ascend

See also
 Crash (disambiguation)